Zelimkhan Tezhdeivich Huseynov (born July 13, 1981 in Dagestan) is a retired Russian and Azerbaijani freestyle wrestler of Chechen heritage who represented Azerbaijan in the Men's freestyle 60 kg at the 2008 Summer Olympics. In the 1/16 final he was beaten by Mavlet Batirov of  Russia. After over two wins in the repechage rounds, he lost the bronze medal wrestling match to Iranian Morad Mohammadi.

External links
 

Living people
1981 births
Wrestlers at the 2008 Summer Olympics
Olympic wrestlers of Azerbaijan
Azerbaijani male sport wrestlers
Chechen martial artists
Chechen people
World Wrestling Championships medalists
European Wrestling Championships medalists